The 15th Pan American Games were held in Rio de Janeiro, Brazil, between 13 July 2007 and 29 July 2007.

Medals

Bronze

Men's 400 meters: Chris Doyle

External links
Athletes of Dominica in 2007 Pan American Games

2007
Nations at the 2007 Pan American Games
Pan